Margaret A. Neary Elementary School is a public school in the town of Southborough, Massachusetts, USA. In the 2019–2020 academic year, it serves 268 students in grades 4 and 5. It serves 4th and 5th graders in Southborough, and is in the Northborough-Southborough Regional School District. Generally, students who complete this school go to nearby Trottier Middle School.

Standardized Test Scores 
Students of the school take the Massachusetts Comprehensive Assessment System (MCAS). The 4th graders take a mathematics, English language arts and open writing prompt, while the 5th graders take the mathematics, science and technology/engineering, and the English language arts tests. The average test score for all of the students is generally higher than that of the entire state and, for all tests in the past few years, is at least 12% higher than the state. In 2019, Neary was recognized by the Massachusetts Department of Education's Accountability System as a "School of Recognition" for exceeding targets.

Bands 
The school has optional performing arts groups, including a band, an orchestra and a chorus.

References 

Southborough, Massachusetts
Schools in Worcester County, Massachusetts
Public elementary schools in Massachusetts